Phalodi tehsil is a tehsil in Jodhpur District of Rajasthan state in western India. Headquarters for the tehsil is the town of Phalodi.

Geography
Phalodi tehsil is the second northernmost of the eleven tehsils in Jodhpur District.  It borders Bap tehsil to the north, Nagaur district to the east, Osian tehsil to the southeast and south, Balesar tehsil and Shergarh tehsil to the south; and Jaisalmer district to the west. It is situated between latitude 27°06' to 27°09' north and 72°20' to 72°23' east. It has an average elevation of 303 metres (994 feet).

History
Phalodi tehsil was much larger before 2012 when the northern part was taken to create Bap tehsil, which had been an independent sub-tehsil with its own local council (panchayat samiti) under Phalodi tehsil.

Villages
There are thirty-eight panchayat villages in Phalodi tehsil.
 

Manewra

Notes

Tehsils of Rajasthan
Jodhpur district